is a Japanese footballer currently playing as a left-back for Yokohama FC from 2023, on loan from Renofa Yamaguchi as a designated special player.

Career statistics

Club
.

Notes

References

External links

1999 births
Living people
Association football people from Kanagawa Prefecture
Keio University alumni
Japanese footballers
Association football defenders
J1 League players
J2 League players
Renofa Yamaguchi FC players
Yokohama FC players